Herbert Gantschacher (born December 2, 1956, at Waiern in Feldkirchen in Kärnten, Carinthia, Austria) is an Austrian director and producer and writer.

Education 
1976 Gantschacher graduated on the second school in Klagenfurt. From 1977 to 1980, he studied at the Academy for Music and Performing Arts at Graz (now University of Music and Performing Arts Graz). He graduated with honors in 1980 and in 1988 he got the M.A. Master of Arts.

Artistic activities 
Gantschacher worked for the Schauspielhaus in Graz, the Salzburg State Theatre, the Tyrolian State Theatre Innsbruck, the Danubefestival in Krems, the Chamberopera in Vienna, the Theater an der Winkelwiese in Zürich, the festival "Musica Iudaica" in Prague, the "Kulturbrauerei" in Berlin, the Polish festival "Theatre without Borders" in Szczecin, the National Theatre of Kosovo in Priština, the National Arts Centre in Ottawa, the Concordia-University in Montreal, the United States Holocaust Memorial Museum in Washington D.C., dem Museum of The Holocaust in Los Angeles, the festival „musica suprimata“ in Sibiu/Hermannstadt and Cluj-Napoca/ Klausenburg in Romania, the Felicja Blumental International Music Festival at the Tel Aviv Museum of Art and the Singapore Arts Festival.

In Dresden Gantschacher worked for the "Staatsschauspiel", the "kleine Szene" of the Semperoper, the "Dresdner Zentrum für zeitgenössische Musik" and the "Festspielhaus Hellerau".

Also in Stockholm he worked for some institutions as the Kulturhuset and the Royal Swedish Opera (Kungliga Operan).

Gantschacher worked also in cities Erfurt, Odessa, Sankt Petersburg, Helsinki and Bergen, there he worked as a lecturer at the University of Bergen in the section of theatre research and at the Saint Petersburg Conservatory

Now Gantschacher is the artistic director of VISUAL The European and International Visual Theatre Festival with deaf and hearing artists and deaf-blind in Vienna and Austria.

He is also the artistic director of the theatre- and research-project "War is daDa". For that research work he created the two projects entitled "Witness and Victim of the Apocalypse" (Exhibition and book about Viktor Ullmann in World War I and the influence of the experiences of war to his music especially to the opera The Emperor of Atlantis or The Disobedience of Death ARBOS, Vienna-Salzburg-Klagenfurt-Arnoldstein-Prora 2007/2008).
A Czech translation of the book has been published at Prague and a Czech version of the exhibition has been presented at the City Archives of Prague in the Clam-Gallas Palace in 2015. A Russian translation of the book has been published at St. Petersburg and a Russian version of the exhibition has been presented at the Russian Museum of the city of Kingisepp and at the House of Composers in St. Perersburg in 2016. A Slovenian translation of the book has been published at Nova Gorica and a Slovenian version of the exhibition has been presented at the museum Grad Kromberk of the Goriški muzej in Nova Gorica in 2018 and 2019.

Other activities 
From 1980 to 1981 Gantschacher was a lecturer at the Academy for Music and Performing Arts in Graz (today University for Music and Performing Arts Graz) and gave also a seminar about the Faust-writings of Goethe, one of his students has been the theatre and opera director Martin Kušej. 1999 Gantschacher was a lecturer at the Institute for Theatre Research of the University Bergen in Norway. In 1999, 2000 and 2016 Gantschacher was a lecturer at the Saint Petersburg Conservatory Rimsky-Korsakov in Russia. In 2018 Gantschacher was the curator of the masterclass project School of Form together with Zvi Semel at the JAMD – Jerusalem Academy of Music and Dance about the composer and musician Viktor Ullmann and the one-armed war-disabled pianist Paul Wittgenstein with masterclasses for voice (Therese Lindquist), violin and chamber music (Annelie Gahl) and composition in classical and jazz style (Wolfgang Pillinger).

Gantschacher worked on a lot of conferences as lecturer and director in Vienna at the International Conference "The Unifying Aspects of Culture" (2003), in Villach "On the Eve of the Apocalypse" (2004), in Nötsch "Art and War" (2005), in Villach "The Great War – The Forgotten War" (2005), "The Great War – The Great Dying" (2006), "The Great War – The Last Victory" (2007), "The Great War – Long Live the Republic!" (2008) and in Nötsch and Arnoldstein "Art.War.Music" about music and The Great War. From 2014 to 2019 he is the curator of the international project "War=daDa" in Nötsch, Arnoldstein (Austria), Prague (Czech Republic), Kingisepp, Saint Petersburg (Russia), Kobarid, Bovec, Lepena (Slovenia), Cividale, Redipuglia, Spilimbergo, Venice (Italia).

Due to his research work Gantschacher reconstructed the Digital Wilhelm Jerusalem Archive in the year 2018 eighty years after its destruction by the Nazis as a part of the memorial year Austria 1918–2018 in a digital form for the department of manuscripts at the national archive of the state of Israel in the national library at the Hebrew University in Jerusalem. Also in 2018 Gantschacher built the Digital Arnold Schönberg Archive in the House, Court and State Archive of the National Archives in Vienna, there he put together for the first time all preserved original documents about the composer Arnold Schönberg and his military service in the First World War from 1914 to 1918 as a digital archive and completed the biography of the composer Schönberg.

For the Austrian Broadcasting Corporation ORF Gantschacher worked as a director for radio drama.

From 1994 to 1999 Gantschacher was a member of the Arts Council of the Government of Carinthia. Since September 2013 he was again a member of the Arts Council of Carinthia till 2018. And from 2013 to 2014 he was the chairman of the Council for Performing Arts of the Government of Carinthia too. 2018 he became the curator of the projects of the State of Carinthia of the memorial year "Austria 1918–2018" and the follow-up projects till 2023.

Since 2015 he works as a columnist for the Kleine Zeitung, one of the most important newspapers of Austria.

Awards 
For his theatre works Gantschacher got some important awards: 
Musictheatreperformance of the year 1993 in the Czech Republic for production of the opera "The Emperor of Atlantis or The Disobedience of Death" by Viktor Ullmann
Maecenas-Price 1994 for the project "Kar", music theatre in the mountains in cooperation with the Verbund-Company
Maecenas-Price 2002 für the project "Theatretraps in the Underground of Vienna"
European Label 2002 for innovative language projects
Maecenas-Price 2003 für the project "Dada in Tramline 1 & Tramline 2"
Nomination for the Bank Austria Art Prize 2012
Award of The UNESCO for the Visual Theatre Library for the "development of human rights for all" 2012
Award by the Federal Minister Gabriele Heinisch-Hosek for the theatre project "Sense of Touch – Sense of Smell – Sense of Taste" about the culture and communication techniques of the deaf-blind with deaf-blind students and five sensed students in 2014
Award by the Federal Minister Sonja Hammerschmid for the theatre project "Layers of History"
Arteco-Price the project "Different Trains" (three operas on a moving train through Europe on stations in Belgium, Germany, Czech Republic, Slovakia, Hungary and Austria dealing with the theme of deportation and death during the Holocaust)
"Cerec-Award" of the Financial Times

Works

Publications

Essays about theatre 
 "Signer and Rossini – two brothers in spirit?" – 1992
 "Crossing Boarders" – 1993
 "The new music theatre project KAR – a cooperation between industry and art" – 1994
 "Music Theatre at the concentration camp of Terezín by the example of the composer Viktor Ullmann and its significance for our time" – 1994
 "The Emperor of Atlantis – Lecture for CINARS 1994 in Montreal" – 1994
 "About the Open Form of Theatrical Art of Theatre – Lecture about the new opera house in Linz" – 1996
 "Memories and present, music and language, original and draft" – 1996
 "Music, Theatre, Dance in Austria – Lecture for CINARS 1996 in Montreal" – 1996
 "Art crossing Boarders" 1997
 "For years, the mirror is imposed! About the correspondences of cultural behavior" – 1998
 "The Art of Dialogue" – 1998
 "Memory as a mirror of ideology" – 2000
 "WorldWideWeb – Reality – Tool – Interaction" –  in: TRANS – Internetmagazine for Cultural Studies Nr.9 – 2000
 "That there is this attempt of political change in the world definitely" – 2004
 "Victim myth Austria" – 2005
 "The Rescue of to be forgotten! – The correspondence between the Austrian-Jewish philosopher Wilhelm Jerusalem and the American deafblind author Helen Keller" – 2009
 "On Your Own - Laudation for the opera and theatre director Univ.-Prof. Mag. Martin Kušej, artistic director of the Austrian National Theatre Burgtheater receiving the Prize for Culture of the State of Carinthia in the Republic of Austria" in German and Slovenian 
 "The Archivist" Laudation for Hubert Steiner 2017.
 "Promoting Cultural Education" essay about the new school-youth-theatre project as a contribution of the State of Carinthia to the memorial year of the Republic of Austria "Austria 1918–2018", gift 1/2018, Vienna 2018, 
 "Peace Education, School Education, Cultural Education" essay about the school-youth-theatre project "The Peace Education of the Individual and of the Society", Klagenfurt 2019.
 "Deafness and Deafblindness in the First World War" essay about Helen Keller, Wilhelm Jerusalem, Werner Mössler, Viktor Ullmann and war-disabled deaf, blind and deafblind persons (together with Gabriele Laube), Vienna 2019.

Books 
 "Crossing the Boarders" – Das Zeichen 22/1992 – 
 "Plurality instead of Uniformity (Klagenfurt on other tracks)" – Kärntner Druck und Verlagsgesellschaft 1996 – 
 "Tracks to Victor Ullmann" with essays written by Viktor Ullmann, Herbert Thomas Mandl, Dževad Karahasan, Ingo Schultz and Herbert Gantschacher published by ARBOS – Company for Music and Theatre / (Vienna: edition selene 1998), 
 "Forms of life" (a theatre book written by Herbert Gantschacher and Dževad Karahasan) – edition selene 1999 – 
 "The Mirror of History – The Past as Ideology" (3rd Prora Conference) – Stiftung Neue Kultur Berlin 2000
 Co-Editor of "The Unifying Aspects of Cultures" – LIT 2004 – 
 "I Carry the Flag or War = daDa" – Peter Lang Europäischer Verlag der Wissenschaften 2006 – , 
 "Witness and Victim of the Apocalypse" (Book for the exhibition about the composer Viktor Ullmann in World War I and the influence of the experiences of war to his music especially to the opera "The Emperor of Atlantis or The Disobidience of Death") – ARBOS, Vienna-Salzburg-Klagenfurt-Arnoldstein-Prora 2007/2008
 "From the Austrian-Hungarian Wehrmacht to the German Wehrmacht" – ARBOS, Vienna-Salzburg-Klagenfurt-Arnoldstein 2009
 "Forward, Don`t Forget!" in "Dirty Bucket K..." edited by  FreiraumK, Drava Verlag-Založba Drava Klagenfurt/Celovec 2013, 
 "VIKTOR ULLMANN ZEUGE UND OPFER DER APOKALYPSE – WITNESS AND VICTIM OF THE APOCALYPSE – Testimone e vittima dell'Apocalisse – Prič in žrtev apokalipse – Svědek a oběť apokalypsy" – Complete original authorized edition in German and English language with summaries in Italian, Slovenian and Czech language, ARBOS-Edition , Arnoldstein-Klagenfurt-Salzburg-Vienna-Prora-Prague first edition 2015 and second edition 2019 with a new preface.
 Viktor Ullmann – Svědek a oběť apokalypsy 1914–1944,  Archiv hlavního města Prahy 2015.
 Герберт Ганчахер Виктор Ульман – Свидетель и жертва апокалипсиса,  «Культ-информ-пресс» Санкт-Петербург 2016.
 At the broadcasting house in the Argentinierstraße was a studio for radiodramas – IN: BROADCASTING HOUSE ANTHOLOGIE Commermorative edited by Gerhard Ruis and Ulrike Stecher, Edition Autorensolidarität, Vienna 2017.
 VERBORGENE GESCHICHTE HIDDEN HISTORY Скрытая история , ARBOS-Edition, Arnoldstein – Klagenfurt – Salzburg – Vienna 2018.
 KRIEGSGEFANGEN – KRIEGSINVALID / PRISONER OF WAR – WAR-DISABLED / военнопленные – инвалиды войны ARBOS-Edition, Arnoldstein – Klagenfurt – Salzburg – Vienna 2018.
 Viktor Ullmann – Priča in Žrtev Apokalipse (dodatno besedilo Aneja Rože, spremno besedilo Marko Klavora, prevod Angela Žugič) Goriški muzej Kromberk, Nova Gorica 2018
 ВИКТОР УЛЬМАН СВИДЕТЕЛЬ И ЖЕРТВА АПОКАЛИПСИСА – Viktor Ullmann Zeuge und Opfer Apokalypse – Witness and Victim of th Apokalypse – Testimone e vittima dell´Apocalisse – Priča in žrtev apokalipse – Svědek a oběť apokalypsy ARBOS-Edition, Arnoldstein – Klagenfurt – Salzburg – Wien 2018.
 "I am the Death, I have survived" – Meetings with Karel Berman musica reanimata Berlin, mr-memorandum Nr.99, December 2019.
 Peacebuilding. Weapons are creating no Peace, and Weapons are not secure any Jobs | Friedensbildung. Waffen schaffen keinen Frieden, und sie sichern auch keine Arbeitsplätze | La cultura di pace. Le armi non portano la pace, e nemmeno garantiscono posti di lavoro | Mirovna vzgoja. Orožje ne prinaša miru in tudi ne zagotavlja delovnih mest in Werner Wintersteiner, Cristina Beretta, Mira Miladinović Zalaznik (Hrsg. | a cura di | ur.): Manifest|o Alpe-Adria. Voices for A European Region of Peace and Prosperity | Manifest|o Alpe-Adria. Stimmen für eine Europa-Region des Friedens und Wohlstands | Voci per una regione europea di pace e prosperità | Glasovi za evropsko regijo miru in blagostanja. Löcker Edition, Vienna 2020 (edition pen Nr. 151). .
 Caelo in terram - Himmel auf Erden - Heaven on Earth - A sort of comedy piece and presumption of innocence with prologue, epilogue and a main act, ARBOS-Edition, Wien-Graz-Klagenfurt 2021.
 Disobey Any Military Work! together with Strike Against the War! by Helen Keller and The War Is Over, But Peace Has Brought Us No Relief. by Wilhelm Jerusalem (both texts are translated into German by Herbert Gantschacher), ARBOS-Edition, Vienna-Salzburg-Klagenfurt 2021.
 Some Notes about the Lives of Wilhelm Jerusalem and Theodor Herzl and the transcription and edition of the letters of Helen Keller and Wilhelm Jerusalem from the original facsimiles translated into German plus the first publication of The Deafblind Author Helen Keller from the original Hebrew into English and German by Edmund Jerusalem translated by Michael Jerusalem and Herbert Gantschacher plus The Deafblind Author, Pacifist and Human Rights Activist Helen Keller connected with the edition of the letters of Helen Keller and the Vice-President of US-President Franklin D. Roosevelt, Henry Wallacce, ARBOS-Edition, Wien-	Salzburg-Klagenfurt 2021.
 The Emperor of Atlantis or The Disobedience of Death Anti-war opera by Viktor Ullmann (Music and libretto), original text of the libretto for the first time published in the German original including translations into English, Polish and Czech language with essays by Herbert Gantschacher and Dževad Karahasan, edited by Herbert Gantschacher, ARBOS-Edition, Vienna-Salzburg-Klagenfurt 2022.
 Turning Points in PERSPECTIVES on Current Affairs in Carinthia 1989-2022 edited by Peter Karpf, Werner Platzer, Wolfgang Platzer and Thomas Pseiner for the Edition of the State of Carinthia, Klagenfurt 2022.

Translations 
 "Disconnected – Kein Anschluß" by Willy Conley. 2000
 "On the edge of the desert" by Dževad Karahasan. 2003
 "Banquet" by Dževad Karahasan. 2005
 "The Universal Drum – Trommeln allerorts" by Willy Conley. 2011
 "Strike Against The War!" by Helen Keller. 2013–2014
 "Salem and the Stubborn Wizard" a picture story about peace from the year 2003 from Damascus by Muḥammad Dīb. 2017–2018, .

Theatreplays 
 "Agnus Dei" draft of a libretto based on a story by Francisco Tanzer, 1987 in: Austrian National Library – Austrian Literature Archive.
 "The Couple" (in cooperation with Francisco Tanzer) 1987/1988 in: Austrian National Library – Austrian Literature Archive. Tanzer
 "Late Afternoon in Paradise". Chamberopera (together with Walter Müller). Music: Stefan Signer – 1992
 "The Language in Space" – 1994
 "The Singing Of The Fools about Europe" together with Dževad Karahasan – 1994 
 "Rehearsals on Dialogues" – 1996
 "19182338 – The number You have called is disconnected". Music theatre. Music: Werner Raditschnig – 1998
 "I Can See Something You Cannot See" – 2000
 "Chronicle 1933–1945". Dokumentary Theatre about the biographies of Robert Ley and Victor Klemperer (together with Katharina and Jürgen Rostock) – 2000
 "Snow and Death". Dramatization of the novel "The Ring of Shahrijar" by Dževad Karahasan – 2002
 "The Death of Empedocles". Dramatization of the Fragments written by Friedrich Hölderlin (in cooperation with Dževad Karahasan) – 2005
 "Banquet". Transmission of the Librettos of Dževad Karahasan from the Bosnian Language. Music: Herbert Grassl, Bruno Strobl and Hossam Mahmoud – 2005
 "A First Step" – 2008
 "Wilhelm Jerusalem – Helen Keller – Letters" – 2008, published as Visual Theatre Library Volume 1;   ARBOS-Edition © & ® 2010–2012
 "Heaven on Earth" – 2012
 *Pig Alm" – 2013
 "Talking Gloves" a visual theatre play about the painter Albin Egger-Lienz and the poet Dichter August Stramm – 2014/2018
 "The Four Seasons" a theatre play about sensual understanding of the deafblind – 2018
 "The Five Senses" a theatre play about the human senses from the perspective of deafblind persons with music from the deafblind Laura Bridgman – 2019
 "M.a.r.s.h." a theatre play for body and bewegte moved voice - 2020 World Premiere at the Anschlussdenkmal Oberschützen in the State of Burgenland in Austria on May 8 and 9 2020
 "One Desk and Three Chairs" a deafblind theatre play 2021 
 "The Snake and The Stork" a deafblind theatre play adopted from a picture story from Bethlehem in Palestine 2022

Exhibitions 
 "Witness and Victim of the Apocalypse – The Austrian Composer Viktor Ullmann in World War I as an artillery observer witnessing the poison gas attack at the Isonzo front on 24 October 1917 in Bovec (Flitsch / Plezzo), and in World War II as victims of murder by poison gas on 18 October 1944 in Auschwitz" – Arnoldstein 2007, Prora 2008, Prague 2015, Kingisepp 2016, St. Petersburg 2016
 "From The Austro-Hungarian Wehrmacht in The German Wehrmacht" – Arnoldstein 2009, Prora 2010
 "About Images and Card Counterfeiters – The Paris Commune in the 19th century, Lenin 1917 and 1918, Austrian school atlas 2008" – Arnoldstein 2010
 ""Refuse Any Military Work!" – Arnoldstein 2011
 "The Servants of All Lords" Arnoldstein 2012
 "'... I receive a pension from the Wiener Philharmoniker subsidy whose amount shall be fixed by the General Assembly in accordance with the available resources ...' AS THE GENERAL ASSEMBLY OF THE VIENNA PHILHARMONIC DEVALUED THE PENSIONS OF THEIR JEWISH MUSICIANS BEFORE THE DEPORTATION IN THE CONCENTRATION CAMPS SHOWN WITH DOCUMENTS FOR ASSET RECOVERY AND QUESTIONS FOR RESTITUTION" – Arnoldstein 2013
 "Political Murder – the instrumentalization of politics in the 18th, 19th, 20th and 21st century" Arnoldstein 2013
 WAR AND LIAR or THE THIRD WAR AT THE BALKANS AS A RESULT OF THE DOUBLE MURDER OF SARAJEVO or THE BREAK OF INTERNATIONAL LAW BY THE IMPERIAL AND ROYAL WEHRMACHT AND THE VIENNESE MINISTRY FOR FOREIGEN AFFAIRS IN BELGIUM IN AUGUST 1914 (Arnoldstein 2014).
 Members of the Vienna Philharmonic in The Great War and The Salzburg Festival 1918 (Arnoldstein 2014).
 WAR CRIMES and WAR RESISTERS (Arnoldstein 2015).
 WOMEN AT WAR: 'La Soldate Femme' Women-Soldiers in The Great War – Helen Keller: 'Strike Against The War! (Arnoldstein 2016).
 „DEAR FRIEND!“: Arnold Schönberg and his piece „Gurrelieder“ and the proposed performance in Switzerland by the "Kriegspressequartier" (Klagenfurt 2017)
 THE LAST BATTLE OPERATOR: Victorious Commander instead of peacebringing Emperor and King Charles (Arnoldstein 2017), 
 The New Year's Concert of the Vienna Philharmonic, its cultural-political origins, its predecessors and forerunners in the context of the former combatants and war invalids in the First World War (Klagenfurt 2017/2018)
 Hidden History – Fate of War-Disabled in Austria – Deafness, Blindness and Deafblindness in The Great War 1914–1918 Vienna
 Viktor Ullmann – Priča in Žrtev Apokalipse Goriški muzej Kromberk, Nova Gorica 2018–2020
 "'... I receive a pension from the Wiener Philharmoniker subsidy whose amount shall be fixed by the General Assembly in accordance with the available resources ...' AS THE GENERAL ASSEMBLY OF THE VIENNA PHILHARMONIC DEVALUED THE PENSIONS OF THEIR JEWISH MUSICIANS BEFORE THE DEPORTATION IN THE CONCENTRATION CAMPS SHOWN WITH DOCUMENTS FOR ASSET RECOVERY AND QUESTIONS FOR RESTITUTION, NEW DOCUMENTS TO THE PERSONS WOBISCH, KERBER, STRASSER, MANKER AND THE CASE OF PROF. ERICH MELLER" Klagenfurt Main Railway Station 2018–2019
 Viktor Ullmann – School of Form Klagenfurt Main Railway Station 2019–2020
 War and War Disability Klagenfurt Main Railway Station 2020
 Disobey Any Military Work! - About Military Work, Compulsory Social Service, Compulsory Military Service, Non-Violence, Conscientious Objectors, Deserters, Murderers and Privatization of War - Helen Keller and Wilhelm Jerusalem as a Part of Global Pacifism Klagenfurt Main Railway Station 2020-2021
 "From the K.u.K. Wehrmacht to the German Wehrmacht - Officers of the Hapsburg Empire made careers in the NS-dictatorship" Klagenfurt Main Railway Station 2022-2023

Films 
 "Viktor Ullmann – Way to the Front 1917" Documentary Film, Book and Director: Herbert Gantschacher, Editor: Erich Heyduck; ARBOS-DVD Vienna-Salzburg-Klagenfurt-Arnoldstein 2007.
 "Spuren nach Theresiestadt – Tracks to Terezín" Documentary Film about the survivor of the Holocaust Herbert Thomas Mandl, Interview and Director: Herbert Gantschacher, Camera: Robert Schabus, Editor: Erich Heyduck/DVD in German and English; ARBOS, Wien-Salzburg-Klagenfurt, 2007.
 "The Emperor of Atlantis or The Disobedience of Death" Documentary Music Theatre about the opera of Viktor Ullmann, Book and Director: Herbert Gantschacher, Sound-engineering: Roumen Dimitrov, Editor: Erich Heyduck, Montage: Dieter Werderitsch; ARBOS-DVD Vienna-Salzburg-Klagenfurt in German 2009, in English 2010, in Italian 2010, in Czech 2015.

Literature 
 Christian Martin Fuchs: "The Trip into the Dream" – 1992
 Burgis Paier: "Love is no Tomato Juice!" – 1993
 Dževad Karahasan: "About the Exile in an Open Society" – 1994
 Dževad Karahasan: "Speech for the award of the Bruno Kreisky Award" – 1995
 Alfred Goubran: "Music for eyes and ears" – 1995
 Dominik Maringer: "Music in Tanzenberg" – 1996. 
 Jean-Jacques van Vlasselaer: "The Emperor of Atlantis" – 1996
 "Theatre Crossin Borders: 'The Emperor of Atlantis'. First production of the CD and Premiere at Terezín" – 1996
 Johannes Birringer: Media & performance: along the border – 1998. 
 Michael Ausserwinkler: "Speech for the Culture Awards 1998"
 Beate Scholz: "Delicatessen!" – 1999
 Carolin Walker "The Project Kar" in: Thomas Heinze "Arts Funding: Sponsoring – Fundraising – Public-Private-Partnership" – 1999. 
 Gerhard Ruiss: "Spent commitments" – 1999
 Guido Fackler: "Voice of the camp – Music in Concentration Camps" – 2000
 Hans-Günter Klein: "Live in the moment, live in eternity. The lectures of the symposium of the 100th Birthday of Viktor Ullmann" – 2000. 
 Alf Krauliz, Marion Mauthe, Lukas Beck: Rooms on the move – 10 years Donaufestival. 2002. 
 Herbert Arlt: "Trans: documentation of a cultural polylog test in the WWW" – 2002. 
 Michal Caban, Šimon Caban, Jan Dvořák: "Baletní jednotka Křeč" – 2003. 
 Elena Makarova, Sergei Makarov, Victor Kuperman: "University Over the Abyss, The story behind 520 lecturers and 2,430 lectures in KZ Theresienstadt 1942–1944" – 2004. 
 Jan Vičar: "IMPRINTS Essays on Czech Music and Aesthetics" – 2005,  (Department of Musicology of Palacký University Faculty of Philosophy in Olomouc),  (Togga)
 Eva Zwick: "Hearing. 'Hearing Rooms' in Deaf Theatre" – 2007
 Dario Oliveri "Musica e cultura nel ghetto di Theresienstadt – 2008, 
 Jana Unuk: "The Vilenica 2010 Prize Winner Dževad Karahasan", pages 9, 13, 17 – 2010. 
 Rafael Ugarte Chacón "Theatre und Deafness" pages 195–203, transcript Edition Bielefeld 2015 
 Gabriela Vojvoda "Room and Construction of Identity in the Novels of Dževad Karahasan" pages 241–253, LIT edition Berlin 2014 
 Irene Suchy & Susanne Kogler "Scores of the Bodies" Gestures in Composition and Performance, Irene Suchy "Signs and Art" (p. 19-21) about performances of paintings of Albin Egger-Lienz and poems of August Stramm, Verlag Bibliothek der Provinz, Weitra 2018, 
 Barry Davis "The Sounds of Theresienstadt live on" essay in the Jerusalem Post published on 2019-12-07, page 12
 Jean-Jaques Van Vlasselaer "Music in the Nazi Concentration Camps" p. 569-580, in "Music in Context – Commemorative for Peter Revers" Hollitzer Edition, Vienna 2019

External links 
 TRANS for Cultural Studies WorldWideWeb - Reality – Tool – Interaction – The Internet Chamber Opera It was raining yesterday evening by Eberhard Eyser (Music) and Eberhard Schmidt (Libretto) after to two stories written by Fernando Namora
 TRANS for Cultural Studies "The Limits of Virtual Reality – Viktor Ullmann – Georg Friedrich Nicolai – Andreas Latzko"
 Viktor Ullmann „The Emperor of Atlantis or The Disobidience of Death“ at the American Legion Building in Hollywood, Los Angeles reviewed by the Los Angeles Times
 Cecilia Porter about Ullmann and "The Emperor of Atlantis or The Disobedience of Death" Feuilleton in the Washington Post
 Viktor Ullmann "The Emperor of Atlantis or The Disobedience of Death" at the United States Holocaust Memorial Museum reviewed by the Washington Post
  Herbert Gantschacher on 1000LETTERS
 Barry Davis "The Sounds of Theresienstadt live on" Essay published by the Jerusalem Post
  Literature by and about Herbert Gantschacher in the catalogue of the Austrian National Library
  Literature by and about Herbert Gantschacher in the catalogue of the National Library of Israel

References 

Austrian male writers
Academic staff of the University of Music and Performing Arts Graz
People from Feldkirchen District
1956 births
Living people